McMichael is a Scottish surname meaning "son of Michael".

Persons with this surname
 Alf McMichael (1927–2006), Northern Irish footballer
 Alford L. McMichael (born 1952), American sergeant major
 Andrew McMichael (born 1943), British professor
 Connor McMichael (born 2001), Canadian ice hockey player
 Dan McMichael (c.1860–1919) Irish-Scottish football manager
 Edward Scott McMichael (1955–2008), American tubist
 Eric McMichael, South Australian architect, designer of the Wondergraph Semaphore in 1920, later the Odeon Star
 Gary McMichael (born 1969), Northern Irish activist and politician 
 Greg McMichael (born 1966) American baseball player
 James McMichael (disambiguation), multiple people
 John McMichael (1948–1987), Northern Irish loyalist
 Sir John McMichael (1904–1993), Scottish cardiologist
 Lokelani McMichael, American triathlete
 Mike McMichael (1915–1997), American basketball player
 Molly McMichael (born 1993), American actress
 Morton McMichael (1807-1879), American newspaper publisher and politician
 Randy McMichael (born 1979), American football player
 Richard McMichael (c.1788–c.1843), American politician
 Robert McMichael (1921–2003), Canadian art collector and philanthropist
 Samuel McMichael (1869–1923), Australian cricketer
 Steve McMichael (born 1957), American football player

See also
 McMichael (disambiguation)
 Morgan McMichaels (born 1981), female persona of Scottish-American drag performer Thomas White
 MacMichael, a surname

Scottish surnames
Patronymic surnames
Surnames from given names